Brayden Payette (born April 6, 2000) is a Canadian curler from Brandon, Manitoba. He currently plays second on Team Jacques Gauthier.

Career
Payette joined the Jacques Gauthier rink at second for the 2019–20 season with Jordan Peters at third and Zack Bilawka at lead. Before this, he played with Chase Dusessoy from 2015 to 2017 and skipped his own team from 2017 to 2019. The team lost in the final of the 2020 Manitoba Junior Provincials to Brett Walter but still got to compete at the 2020 Canadian Junior Curling Championships, representing the second Manitoba team as Nunavut and Yukon did not send teams. The team finished the round robin and championship pool with a 9–1 record which qualified them for the final. The team curled 92% which led them to a 8–6 victory over Newfoundland and Labrador's Daniel Bruce. At the 2020 World Junior Curling Championships, the team finished the round robin in second with a 7–2 record. In the playoffs, they defeated Germany in the semifinal and Switzerland in the final to claim the gold medal.

Personal life
Payette currently works as an apprentice carpenter.

Teams

References

External links

2000 births
Living people
Canadian male curlers
Curlers from Manitoba
Sportspeople from Brandon, Manitoba